Euriphene amaranta is a butterfly in the family Nymphalidae. It is found from Cameroon to the Democratic Republic of the Congo (Uele, Tshopo, Kivu) and in western Uganda.

References

Butterflies described in 1894
Euriphene
Butterflies of Africa